Reza Talaei-Nik is an Iranian military officer and conservative politician. 

He currently serves as a deputy for defence minister, having previously held office as a member of the Parliament, and a member of its national security and foreign policy commission.

He was formerly secretary-general of the Development and Justice Party, a party closely associated with Mohsen Rezaei.

References

Living people
Year of birth missing (living people)
Members of the 6th Islamic Consultative Assembly
Members of the 7th Islamic Consultative Assembly
Islamic Revolutionary Guard Corps personnel of the Iran–Iraq War
Development and Justice Party politicians
Secretaries-General of political parties in Iran
Islamic Revolutionary Guard Corps second brigadier generals